Kaiyun may refer to:

 Kaiyun Town (开云镇), a town of Hengshan County, Hunan.

Historical eras
Kaiyun (開運, 944–946), era name used by Shi Chonggui, emperor of Later Jin (also used by concurrent rulers of Chu (Ten Kingdoms), Wuyue and Jingnan)
Kaiyun (開運, 1034), era name used by Emperor Jingzong of Western Xia